Best of Budgie was the second compilation album by Welsh rock band Budgie, after the 1975 compilation of the same name. It consisted solely of tracks from the first two Budgie albums, Budgie and Squawk.

Track listings

Personnel
Budgie
Burke Shelley - bass, vocals
Tony Bourge - guitar
Ray Phillips - drums

Budgie (band) compilation albums
1981 greatest hits albums